D'Jamila Tavares (born 17 November 1994) is an athlete from São Tomé and Príncipe.

She trains at the Agua de Pena Sports Association on the Portuguese island of Madeira. Tavares was selected to compete in the women's 800 metres at the 2020 Summer Games and was given the honour of being the flag bearer for her nation in the opening ceremony.

References

External links
 
 Profile at myKhel.com 

1994 births
Living people
São Tomé and Príncipe female athletes
Athletes (track and field) at the 2020 Summer Olympics
Olympic athletes of São Tomé and Príncipe
Female middle-distance runners